The Ayotha Amirtha Gangai is a mythical river found in the text Akilathirattu Ammanai, the source of Ayyavazhi mythology. Ayotha Amirtha Gangai was located in Ayotha Amirtha Vanam, the place where Thirumal, through the instrumentality of the Seven Virgins, gave birth to the Santror Makkal. The land is surrounded by Sri Rangam in the north, Mount Thirikonam in the south, Puttaapuram in the east and Poonkavu in the west.

See also

List of Ayyavazhi-related articles

Ayyavazhi mythology